The Battle of Rocky Face Ridge was fought May 7–13, 1864, in Whitfield County, Georgia, during the Atlanta Campaign of the American Civil War. The Union army was led by Maj. Gen. William Tecumseh Sherman and the Confederate army by Gen. Joseph E. Johnston.  Confederates were forced to evacuate their strong position due to a Union flanking movement.

Battle
General Johnston had entrenched his army on the long, steep Rocky Face Ridge and eastward across Crow Valley. When Sherman approached, he demonstrated against this position with two columns while he sent a third one through Snake Creek Gap, to the south, to hit the Western & Atlantic Railroad at Resaca. The first two columns engaged the enemy at Buzzard Roost (Mill Creek Gap) and at Dug Gap while the third column, under Maj. Gen. James B. McPherson, passed through Snake Creek Gap and on the May 9 advanced to the outskirts of Resaca, where it found Confederates entrenched. Fearing the strength of the enemy, McPherson pulled his column back to Snake Creek Gap. On May 10, Sherman decided to join McPherson in an effort to take Resaca. The next morning, Sherman's army withdrew from in front of Rocky Face Ridge. Discovering Sherman's movement, Johnston retired south towards Resaca on May 12.

Battlefield
In 2016, the Civil War Trust (a division of the American Battlefield Trust) and its partners acquired, for purposes of preservation, 301 acres of the Rocky Face Ridge Battlefield, including surviving earthworks and the remains of a continuous entrenchment more than 2,000 feet long. That purchase expanded the total battlefield acreage acquired and preserved by the Trust and its partners to 926 acres.

Gallery

See also
Rocky Face, Georgia
Drums in the Deep South, a movie loosely based on this battle

Notes

References
 National Park Service battle description

Atlanta campaign
Battles of the Western Theater of the American Civil War
Union victories of the American Civil War
Battles of the American Civil War in Georgia (U.S. state)
Battle of Rocky Face Ridge
Conflicts in 1864
1864 in Georgia (U.S. state)
May 1864 events